Antoni ‘’Kolka’’ Kolczyński (August 25, 1917 – June 19, 1964) was a Polish boxer, champion of Europe and participant in the Olympic Games.

In 1937 he won silver in the Championships of Poland, and  next year, he was chosen the best fighter of the Europe - United States boxing match. Also, in 1938 he was voted second most popular athlete of Poland, in the Przeglad Sportowy plebiscite.

During the 1939 European Amateur Boxing Championships in Dublin, Kolczynski achieved his biggest success, winning gold. In the final fight of the welterweight, he beat Erik Ågren from Sweden.

During World War II, Kolczynski was unable to continue career. After 1945, he never got back to the late-1930s form. He participated in the 1948 Olympic Games in London as well as other tournaments without much success. However, he was a top champion of Poland, winning the national competitions in 1946, 1947, 1950 and 1951. Kolczynski ended career in 1952. Altogether, he fought 238 times, winning 216 fights and losing 22.

1948 Olympic results
Below is the record of Antoni Kolczyński, a Polish middleweight boxer who competed at the 1948 London Olympics:

 Round of 32: bye
 Round of 16: lost to Dogomar Martinez (Uruguay) on points

References

1917 births
1964 deaths
Boxers at the 1948 Summer Olympics
Olympic boxers of Poland
Welterweight boxers
People from Płońsk County
Sportspeople from Masovian Voivodeship
Polish male boxers